The Sealed Room (also known as The Sealed Door) is an eleven-minute film released in September 1909. Produced by the Biograph Company and directed by D. W. Griffith, the drama's cast includes Arthur V. Johnson, Marion Leonard, Henry B. Walthall, Mary Pickford, and Mack Sennett. It was distributed to theaters on a split-reel with another film, the three-minute comedy short The Little Darling.

Plot

The film's theme of immurement draws inspiration from Balzac's "La Grande Bretêche", and Edgar Allan Poe's "The Cask of Amontillado". The king constructs a cozy, windowless love-nest for himself and his concubine. However, she is not faithful to her sovereign, but consorts with the court troubadour. In fact, they use the king's new play chamber for their trysts. When the king discovers this, he sends for his masons. With the faithless duo still inside, the masons use stone and mortar to quietly seal the only door to the vault. The two lovers suffocate and the film ends.

Cast
Arthur V. Johnson as The Count
Marion Leonard as The Countess
Henry B. Walthall as The Minstrel

others
Linda Arvidson as A Lady-in-Waiting
William J. Butler as Nobleman at Court
Vernon Clarges as Nobleman at Court
Owen Moore as Nobleman at Court
George Nichols as Workman
Anthony O'Sullivan as Workman
Mary Pickford as A Lady-in-Waiting
Gertrude Robinson as A Lady-in-Waiting
Mack Sennett as A Soldier
George Siegmann as Nobleman at Court

Notes

References

The Sealed Room at silentera.com

External links
 
 
 The Sealed Room on YouTube

1909 films
1909 short films
1909 horror films
1900s horror drama films
American horror drama films
American black-and-white films
American silent short films
Films about infidelity
Films about murder
American films about revenge
Films about royalty
Films based on works by Honoré de Balzac
Films based on works by Edgar Allan Poe
Films based on multiple works
Films directed by D. W. Griffith
Films with screenplays by Frank E. Woods
1900s American films
Silent American drama films
Silent horror films